Deepak Prakash is an Indian politician and a member of the Rajya Sabha from Jharkhand. He is also the state president of the Bharatiya Janata Party's Jharkhand Unit. He has also held the posts of vice-president and secretary in the past in BJP's Jharkhand unit.

Deepak Prakash, who was initially connected with Akhil Bhartiya Vidyarthi Parishad during his early days and a member of the Rashtriya Swayamsevak Sangh since 1973 and later joined BJP, is said to be very close to Marandi. When Babulal Marandi formed JVM (P) in 2006, Prakash was one of the prominent leaders who joined him, but again came back to BJP fold after a few years.

References

Bharatiya Janata Party politicians from Jharkhand
Living people
Rajya Sabha members from Jharkhand
Jharkhand Vikas Morcha (Prajatantrik) politicians
1960 births